Llansanffraid Glyndyfrdwy is a former civil parish in the Edeirnion area of Denbighshire in Wales.  Until 1974 it was part of Meirionnydd, and was transferred to Glyndŵr District in Clwyd by the Local Government Act 1972.  It became part of Denbighshire in 1996, and now forms part of the community of Corwen.  It includes the village of Carrog.

References

Villages in Denbighshire
Corwen